Bao-Bab, czyli zielono mi is a Polish comedy television series broadcast in 2003. Twelve episodes were aired on TVP1. It was directed by Jan Kidawa-Błoński and Krzysztof Lang and revolves around the adventures of the first female unit in the Polish army.

Cast and characters

External links

Polish comedy television series
2003 Polish television series debuts
2000s Polish television series
Telewizja Polska original programming